The term Metropolitanate of Belgrade may refer to:

 Metropolitanate of Belgrade, an ecclesiastical province (metropolitanate) of the Serbian Orthodox Church in Habsburg Monarchy, that existed between 1718 and 1739.
 Serbian Orthodox Metropolitanate of Belgrade, an ecclesiastical province (metropolitanate) of the Serbian Orthodox Church, that existed between 1831 and 1920, with jurisdiction over the territory of Serbia.
 Roman Catholic Metropolitanate of Belgrade, an ecclesiastical province (metropolitanate) of the Roman Catholic Church in Serbia, created in 1986.

See also
 Belgrade
 Archbishop of Belgrade (disambiguation)
 Archbishopric of Belgrade (disambiguation)
 Archdiocese of Belgrade (disambiguation)
 Eastern Orthodoxy in Serbia
 Catholic Church in Serbia